Boag is a surname. Notable people with the surname include:

 Carly Boag (born 1991), Australian basketball player
 Colin Boag, British Army officer
 Erin Boag (born 1975), New Zealand ballroom dancer
 G. T. Boag (1884–1969), British civil servant
 James Boag I (c. 1804–1890), Australian brewery founder and proprietor
 James Boag II (1854–1919), Australian brewery proprietor
 John Boag (disambiguation), various people
 Keith Boag, Canadian television journalist
 Peter Boag, Canadian scientist
 Michelle Boag (born 1954), New Zealand public relations practitioner
 Tommy Boag (1814–1977), Australian rules footballer
 Wally Boag (1920–2011), American stage performer
 Yvonne Boag (born 1954), Scottish-born Australian artist

See also
 Boag's Brewery, an Australian brewery